Carro may refer to:

 Carro, municipality at the Province of La Spezia in the Italian region Liguria
 Carro (surname), Spanish surname 
 Carro Pass, gently sloping snow pass linking Holluschickie Bay and the bay between Rink Point and Stoneley Point on the northwest coast of James Ross Island
 Refuge du Carro, refuge in the department of Savoie in the region Rhône-Alpes, France

See also 

 Caro (disambiguation)
 Carra (disambiguation)